Central Africa Time or CAT, is a time zone used in central and southern Africa. Central Africa Time is two hours ahead of Coordinated Universal Time (UTC+02:00), which is the same as the adjacent South Africa Standard Time, Egypt Standard Time, Eastern European Time, Kaliningrad Time and Central European Summer Time.

As this time zone is in the equatorial and tropical regions, there is little change in day length throughout the year and so daylight saving time is not observed.

Central Africa Time is observed by the following countries:

 (eastern side only)

The following countries in Africa also use an offset of UTC+02:00 all-year round:

 (observes Egypt Standard Time)
 (observes South African Standard Time)
 (observes South African Standard Time)
 (observes Eastern European Time)
 (observes South African Standard Time)

See also 
 Egypt Standard Time, an equivalent time zone covering Egypt, also at UTC+02:00
 Kaliningrad Time, an equivalent time zone covering Kaliningrad Oblast, Russia, also at UTC+02:00
 Israel Standard Time, an equivalent time zone covering the State of Israel during winter, also at UTC+02:00
 Eastern European Time, an equivalent time zone covering European and Middle Eastern countries during winter, also at UTC+02:00
 Central European Summer Time, an equivalent time zone covering most European countries during daylight saving, also at UTC+02:00
 South African Standard Time, an equivalent time zone covering the South Africa, also at UTC+02:00

Time zones
Time in Africa